1984 in professional wrestling describes the year's events in the world of professional wrestling.

List of notable promotions 
These promotions held notable shows in 1984.

Calendar of notable shows

Notable events
 
 January 23 - Hulk Hogan defeats The Iron Sheik to win the WWF World Heavyweight Championship at Madison Square Garden, New York, NY
 February 11 - After many months of waiting, Tito Santana finally beat Don Muraco to become the first Mexican-American wrestler to win the WWF Intercontinental Championship at Boston Garden. 
 May 29 – Tuesday Night Titans premiered on the USA Network
 July 14 – Black Saturday (professional wrestling)
 July 23 - Wendi Richter became the New WWF Women's Champion ending the Fabulous Moolah's 28-year reign as champion at New York's Madison Square Garden.
September 18 - Pro Wrestling USA debuted with a inguinal TV taping at the Mid South Coliseum in Memphis, Tennessee

Accomplishments and tournaments

JCP

NJPW

Awards and honors

Pro Wrestling Illustrated

Wrestling Observer Newsletter

Births
January 21 - Alex Koslov 
January 25 - Jay Briscoe (died in 2023)
February 2 - Brian Cage 
February 6 - Ivan Markov  
February 17 - Jimmy Jacobs
February 24 – Corey Graves
March 3 - Ivar 
April 20 - Garett Bischoff 
April 30 
 Daivari 
 El Hijo del Fantasma
May 4:
Brad Maddox 
Orange Cassidy 
Sylvester Lefort 
May 7 – Kevin Owens
May 14 - John Klinger 
May 16 - Mickie Knuckles 
May 29 – Nia Jax
June 5 - Madison Eagles 
June 30 – Scott Dawson
July 12 – Sami Zayn
July 13 - Ayumi Kurihara 
July 31 – El Texano Jr.
August 20 - Fuka Kakimoto 
August 21  
Erik 
Eve Torres
September 3 – T. J. Perkins
September 10 – Drake Younger
September 13 – Baron Corbin
September 19 – Eva Marie
September 30 – Darryl Sharma
October 6 – Afa Anoa'i Jr.
October 22 - Aero Star
November 7 - Jacob Novak 
November 13 – Sunil Singh
December 4 – Brooke Adams
December 10 – JTG
December 11 - James Ellsworth 
December 24 - Pat Buck 
December 25 – Rusev

Debuts
Uncertain debut date
Steve Armstrong
Steve Doll
Fred Ottman
Yokozuna
February - Italian Stallion
March 3 - Jushin Liger
April 5 - Marty Jannetty
June 11 - Kendall Windham
June 24 - Nikita Koloff 
September 1 - Shinya Hashimoto
October 2 - Scott Hall
October 5 - Masa Chono, Keiji Muto
October 12 - Akira Nogami
October 16 - Shawn Michaels

Retirements
 Angelo Mosca (1969 - 1984)
 Billy Red Lyons (1956 - 1984)
 Paul Vachon (1957 - 1984)
 Stan Stasiak (1958 - 1984)
 Tommy Gilbert (1969 - 1984)
 Miguel Perez (1954-1984)

Deaths
January 18 – Lord Athol Layton, 62
January 27 - Jim McMillen, 81 
February 5 - El Santo, 66
February 10 – David Von Erich, 25  
March 4 – Helen Hild, 58
May 16 - Andy Kaufman, 35
May 17 – Max Palmer, 56
May 22 - George Zaharias, 76
May 24 – Vincent J. McMahon, 69 
July 14 – Brute Bernard, 63
August 2 – Argentina Apollo, 46
November 13 - Chief Little Wolf, 72

See also
List of WCW pay-per-view events

References

 
professional wrestling